Total Engine Concepts MM CB-40 is a four-stroke, two-cylinder, Half VW aircraft engine.

Design and development
The engine was progressively developed designed around Volkswagen air-cooled engine components. Global Motors originally designed a Half VW engine for use in light aircraft. The company and its designs were then sold to Mosler Motors. Warren Mosler specialized in racing engines and added the engine to the list of products eventually marketed under the company name Total Engine Concepts. The engine was dropped from production in 1998.

The CB-40 was re-engineered to overcome problems of vibration and cooling in the original design.

Suited for ultralight use and single seat light sport aircraft, the engine weighs 86 lbs and produces .  The engine uses a short aluminum crankcase with redesigned oil galleries for improved lubrication. The engine is counterweight balanced with a drop-forged crankshaft.

Variants
CB-40
Base model  94mm bore 78mm stroke.
CB-35
 92mm bore 78mm stroke.

Applications
Preceptor N3 Pup
Sorrell Hiperlight
Mini-MAX
Pik-26

Specifications MM CB-40

See also

References

External links

Boxer engines
1990s aircraft piston engines